Agence des Balkans et d'Orient was a Paris-based news bureau, active during World War I. Henri Pozzi was the director of the bureau.

References

News agencies based in France